The Legend of Alfred Packer is a 1980 American biographical Western film directed by Jim Roberson from a script by Burton Raffel. It is a biopic of Alfred Packer starring Patrick Dray in the title role. The film features a score by Bolivian composer Jaime Mendoza-Nava, though the main theme is derivative of Mason Williams's "Classical Gas".

The "Alferd" spelling and pronunciation of his first name is not used in the film.

Plot
McMurphy comes to Denver, Colorado, to see Polly Pry about the Packer case. As Pry leaves for her scheduled meeting with McMurphy, she is stalked and shot at by a gunman. The bullets hit her skirts and lessen the blows inflicted on her publishers behind her. McMurphy and Pry meet in a tavern to discuss the Packer story over whiskey. She begins with the five prospectors who will become victims meeting up for the first time at a boardinghouse, where the landlady tells them that Alfred Packer is the best guide in the area.

The men find Packer in a small prison, and pay his bail so that he can be their guide. They join together with the larger group, but are soon split up, and they get suckered into the hospitality of a trapper and his sidekick, Weasel, who intend to rape George Noon. Packer and the men escape, but get hopelessly lost in Ute territory. When Packer is scouting ahead, he returns to find that Shannon Wilson Bell, a Mormon missionary, has killed and begun to eat the other prospectors. Packer and Bell fight; Bell falls, landing on a knife, and is killed.

After several months, Packer comes out of the mountains into the nearest town and makes his report to General Adams. Later, while at Dolan's Bar, his story having been investigated, he is captured and brought to trial. The remainder of the film depicts his trial. Judge Gerry reads his sentence as per the court records, though omitting the two consecutive repeats of "dead." As Packer walks through the courthouse door, a blue glow emanates from behind it, the image freezes, and, in voiceover and overlain title cards, Pry briefly summarizes what happened to Packer after the trial.

Cast
 Dave Ellington as James Humphrey
 Patrick Dray as Alfred G. Packer
 Ronald Haines as Shannon Wilson Bell
 Jim Dratfield as George "California" Noon
 Bob Damon as Israel Swan
 Ron Holiday as Frank "Reddy" Miller
 Lawrence Bleir as McMurphy
 Cynthia Nessin as Polly Pry
 Tom Peru as O.D. Loutsenhizer
 Don Donovan as General Adams
 Dick Morgan as Trapper
 George Farrar as Weasel
 Sam Kirbens as Judge Gerry
 Ruth Seder as Landlady

Home media
The film was released on VHS by Monterey Home Video.

In 2008, it was packaged in an eight-film DVD set, "Legends of the West", with Johnny Yuma, Joshua, Gatling Gun, Big Bad John, Find a Place to Die, Grand Duel, and China 9, Liberty 37.

See also
 Cannibalism in popular culture
 Cannibal! The Musical
 Ravenous

External links
 
 

1980 films
1980s adventure films
1980s biographical films
1980s thriller drama films
1980 Western (genre) films
American adventure drama films
American biographical drama films
American thriller drama films
American Western (genre) films
Films about cannibalism
Thriller films based on actual events
Films set in Colorado
Works about Alferd Packer
1980 drama films
1980s English-language films
1980s American films